B1 Road is a major road in Kenya connecting Nakuru to the Ugandan border. The road can be divided into two distinct parts: Nakuru - Kisumu highway and  Kisumu-Busia highway.

The eastern end of the road begins from Mau Summit east of Nakuru, where it diverts from to the A104 road (Nairobi to Uganda via Eldoret). The section between Ahero and Kisumu is common with A1 road.

Oil tanker explosion

On 20 September 2011, less than 10 days after the 2011 Nairobi pipeline fire, a tanker carrying gasoline from Kisumi to Busia overturned, spilling its contents. Four people were killed and 35 injured when the oil tanker exploded. Some of those injured are reported to have been siphoning off the gasoline.

Towns  

The following towns, listed from east towards the west, are located along the highway 

Mau Summit
Kericho
Kapsoit
Awasi
Ahero
Kisumu
Maseno
Luanda
Yala
Ugunja
Got Nanga
Bumala
Busia (border town to Uganda)

References 

Roads in Kenya